Bob Dylan (born Robert Allen Zimmerman, May 24, 1941) is an American singer-songwriter, artist and writer. He has been influential in popular music and culture for more than five decades. Much of his most celebrated work dates from the 1960s, when he was both a chronicler and reluctant figurehead of social unrest. Early songs such as "Blowin' in the Wind" and "The Times They Are a-Changin'" became anthems for the Civil Rights Movement and anti-war movement. Leaving his initial base in the American folk music revival, Dylan's six-minute single "Like a Rolling Stone" altered the range of popular music in 1965. His mid-1960s recordings, backed by rock musicians, reached the top end of the United States music charts while also attracting denunciation and criticism from others in the folk movement.

The Never Ending Tour commenced on June 7, 1988, and Dylan has played roughly 100 dates a year for the entirety of the 1990s and 2000s—a heavier schedule than most performers who started out in the 1960s. By May 2013, Dylan and his band had played more than 2,500 shows, anchored by long-time bassist Tony Garnier, multi-instrumentalist Donnie Herron, and guitarist Charlie Sexton.

1960s

1970s

1980s

1990s

2000s

2010s

2020s
Rough and Rowdy Ways World Wide Tour

Non-Tour performances

1950s

1956

1958

1959

1960s

1960

1961

1962

2000s

2002

2004

2005

2009

2010s

2010

2011

2012

2014

2015

References

External links
BobLinks – Comprehensive log of concerts and set lists
BobDylan.com – Bob Dylan's Official Website Tour Page
Bjorner's Still on the Road – Information on recording sessions and performances

Dylan, Bob
Concert tours